Francisco de Asís Rivera Ordóñez (prev. The Duke of Montoro; born 3 January 1974 in Madrid) is a Spanish torero or 'bullfighter'.

Family lineage
Rivera comes from  a long line of famous bullfighters: his great-grandfather was Cayetano Ordóñez, El Nino de la Palma; his grandfather was Antonio Ordóñez; his great-uncle was Luis Miguel Dominguín; his father was Francisco Rivera Paquirri; his brother is Cayetano Rivera Ordóñez;  his cousin is Jose Antonio Canales Rivera.

Bullfighting career
In 2009, he was awarded the Fine Arts medal by the Culture Ministry of Spain, a coveted bullfighting prize, but his receipt resulted in a public outcry.

Personal life
He is the son of Paquirri (Francisco Rivera) and Carmen Ordóñez, and his brother is the matador Cayetano Rivera Ordóñez.  His father’s second wife was Isabel Pantoja, with whom Francisco has a half brother, Francisco Jose Rivera Pantoja. 

He has one daughter, Cayetana Rivera y Martínez de Irujo (born October 16, 1999), from his marriage to Eugenia Martínez de Irujo, 12th Duchess of Montoro, on October 23, 1998. The couple divorced in 2002. Eugenia's mother was the Duchess of Alba, Cayetana Fitz-James Stuart, who was the most titled noble in the world.

In 2011, Francisco Rivera started dating Lourdes Beatriz Montes Parejo, then a 27-year-old lawyer from Sevilla.

They married on September 14, 2013 in Ronda. They have a daughter, named Carmen (born August 19, 2015).

Books
Rivera Ordóñez, who is known in the press as "Fran", was the subject of the book Death and the Sun: A Matador's Season in the Heart of Spain by American journalist Edward Lewine.  
In 2012 he was again involved in a book, The Bull and The Ban by filmmaker Catherine Tosko and British bullfighter and writer Alexander Fiske-Harrison.

See also
List of bullfighters

References

External links
Spanish Celebrities: Francisco Rivera Ordoñez, includes a picture.
Portal Taurino article

1974 births
Living people
Spanish bullfighters
Spanish people of Romani descent